The Cheerful Soul (Italian:Anima allegra) is a 1919 Italian silent comedy film directed by Roberto Roberti and starring Francesca Bertini. It is based on play by Serafín Álvarez Quintero.

Cast
 Francesca Bertini 
 Luigi Cigoli 
 Gemma De Sanctis 
 Sig Pasquali 
 Livio Pavanelli 
 Maria Riccardi
 Sandro Salvini 
 Giovanni Schettini

References

Bibliography
 Goble, Alan. The Complete Index to Literary Sources in Film. Walter de Gruyter, 1999.

External links

1919 films
Italian films based on plays
1919 comedy films
Italian comedy films
1910s Italian-language films
Films directed by Roberto Roberti
Italian silent feature films
Italian black-and-white films
Silent comedy films